Project 62M Condominium located in Winnipeg, Manitoba, Canada, at the edge of downtown Winnipeg and the Red River, was designed by 5468796 Architecture. The residential development completed in 2018 has been unofficially nicknamed the “ flying saucer” or also known as the “UFO.” The reason behind these nicknames comes from its circular shape that rise over the city skyline (between the adjacent freeway and the back of the neighboring properties located in the area).

Its site was originally thought to be undesirable due to “its industrial nature, restricted views out of the site, and lack of street frontage.” However, instead of discouraging 5468796 Architecture firm, it was undertaken as a design challenge to flip the public perception of the area.

Architecture 
Project 62M shows innovative ideas in housing and massing structure while following a small budget inside a city.

Concept 
Project 62M can be considered as a project based on redefining budget prioritization during the design process. This would be achieved through the use of “cheaper alternatives” such as material, site location, decoration, etc.

Quoting the architect “This leads to an innate frugality of our interventions, shaving off the excess in order to create projects that do not depend on extraneous or decorative elements.” Which is one of the firm highlights to respect to architectural design.

Design process 
The shape of the building originated from addressing two different design challenges, site location and budget size. The site's location is between industrial buildings and the base of an elevated freeway, limiting the building view and free space.

The first step to address the site location was by elevating the building to provide daylight access and a better view of the city. However, this solution created a conflict with the budget creating the second challenge during the design process. The designers explored different solutions to keep the new design within the budget. This solution was the circular shape that would use "30 per cent less exterior envelope than rectilinear shapes would need." This solution didn't just solve the cost efficiency but also provided a panoramic view through six meters of floor-to-ceiling glass.

However, to make this work, it needed to be discussed with traders and contractors involved in the project to give a green light into building it. After the designer brought to light that it shouldn't be any different from making it in the ground, the idea of prefabrication was the best option for a budget-friendly construction.

Forty identical pie-shaped units were prefabricated by the contractors to be put together at the top of a concrete core. Inside this concrete core was found the staircase and elevator to the building.

Materials 
The materials used during the design and construction of Project 62M are:

These rustic materials are what give a contrast between the interior against the exterior facades and were also a more cost efficient option.

Structure objective 
The circular design of the 62M Condominium is innovative and resourceful. Not only does its form serve as a design statement in architecture, but it is cost-effective by reducing the elevation cost of the building and "providing a narrow circumference/area dedicated to communal corridors and the widest possible perimeter for suite windows in order to optimize construction costs."

Furthermore, the architects decided that using a pre-fabricated structure would be the best budget-friendly solution to reduce construction time. Besides, the raw touches of the pre-fabricated building would be used as part of the interior decoration to save even more money in the future maintenance costs that the building would end up needing (aside from simplifying the construction process).

References 

 Van Es Karl. “ 5468796 Architecture create residential building that hovers over the Winnipeg skyline.” Avontuura. Last modified May 4, 2017. https://www.avontuura.com/62m-5468796-architecture/
 Boddy Trevor. “ 62M Condominium Apartments in Canada by  5468796 Architecture.” The Architectural Review. Last Modified March 9, 2017. https://www.architectural-review.com/buildings/62m-condominium-apartments-in-canada-by-5468796-architecture
 5468796 Architecture. “A decade of Housing by 5468796 Architecture.” Canadian Architect. Last modified December 4, 2018. https://www.canadianarchitect.com/add-via-edit-a-decade-of-housing/
 Bellamy Brent. “ A UFO-Shaped Condo Building Alights on Winnipeg’s Skyline.” Azura Magazine. Last modified February 25, 2019. https://www.azuremagazine.com/article/condo-building-winnipeg-5468796-architecture/

Other Sources 

 5468796 Architecture. “5468796 Architecture.” Last Accessed February 1, 2022. https://www.5468796.ca/
 Furuto Allison. “ Flying Saucer’ Condominium Proposal/ 5468796 Architecture.” Arch Daily. Last Accessed February 1, 2022. https://www.archdaily.com/363318/flying-saucer-condominium-proposal-5468796-architecture
 Novakovic Stefan, Jackson Kendra, Pavka Evan, Sinopoli Danny, Viggiani Daniella, Pagliacolo Elizabeth. “The 10 Projects that Defined a Decade of Canadian Architecture .“ Azura Magazine. Last modified December 18, 2019. https://www.azuremagazine.com/article/best-canadian-architecture-decade-2010/

Residential buildings in Canada